Michael Duncan Buerk (born 18 February 1946) is a British journalist and newsreader. He presented BBC News from 1973 to 2002 and has been the host of BBC Radio 4's The Moral Maze since 1990. He was also the presenter of BBC One's docudrama 999 from 1992 to 2003. From 2017, Buerk also presented the TV programme Royal Recipes which ran for two series.

Early life
Buerk was born on 18 February 1946 in Solihull, Warwickshire, and attended Solihull School, an independent school in the West Midlands where he was a member of the Combined Cadet Force and represented the school on the sports field.

Buerk's hopes of a career in the Royal Air Force were dashed when he failed an eyesight test at the selection centre. He briefly worked as a hod carrier.

Reporter and newsreader
Buerk began his career in journalism with the Bromsgrove Messenger, South Wales Echo (he shared a house with Sue Lawley in Cardiff), and the Daily Mail. In 1970, he joined BBC Radio Bristol, where he was the first voice heard on air, before becoming a network reporter for BBC News in 1973.

From 1983 to 1987, Buerk was the BBC's South Africa correspondent during the dying years of apartheid in South Africa. Buerk's uncompromising reports on the brutalities of the regime resulted in the South African government expelling him from the country after four years in the post.

Buerk's reporting of the Ethiopian famine in October 1984 inspired the Band Aid charity record and, subsequently, the Live Aid concerts. His report is regarded as a watershed moment in crisis reporting that influenced modern coverage.

He later anchored the BBC Nine O'Clock News and BBC News at Ten. He read the bulletin at 0100 GMT on 1 January 2000, the first BBC News bulletin of the 2000s.

Buerk announced his retirement from BBC News in 2002, though he said he would continue to host other programmes. Despite his retirement, he occasionally appeared on BBC News as an occasional relief presenter until 2004.

Other work

In 2010, Buerk narrated Sky1 reality show Pineapple Dance Studios. Buerk has also made five guest appearances on the BBC's The One Show in April and September 2010. He has also appeared as a fill-in presenter for Jason Manford on six occasions.

Since July 2012, Buerk has co-presented ITV's  Britain's Secret Treasures with Bettany Hughes, looking at fifty of the most remarkable archaeological finds made by the British public.  On 6 October 2013, he began hosting Inside the National Trust, a new documentary series.

Buerk has hosted BBC Radio 4's  The Moral Maze since 1990 and The Choice since 1998. On 22 October 2014, the BBC apologised for the language used in Buerk's early morning trail for that evening's Moral Maze in which he began: "Nobody comes out of the Ched Evans rape case with any credit – not the victim who'd drunk so much she could barely stand, nor the two footballers who had sex with her in the most sordid of circumstances." Katie Russell, from Rape Crisis England and Wales, accused him of practising "victim-blaming." She commented: "To infer that being drunk is in any way 'morally' comparable to committing the serious and violent crime of rape is deeply offensive."

In 2013, Buerk voiced a Marmite advert in which spoof rescue teams rescue lost forgotten jars at the back of cupboards and fridges and despite receiving a number of complaints the advert still continues.

Beginning on 16 November 2014, Buerk took part in the fourteenth series of I'm a Celebrity...Get Me Out of Here! On 3 December 2014, he was the third celebrity to be eliminated in the public vote.

Charity work
On 28 July 2007, Buerk appeared on a celebrity version of Who Wants to Be a Millionaire? with Jennie Bond to raise money for NCH, the children's charity.  Between them they won £64,000.  He is a supporter of the British Red Cross and in October 2008 came out in support of an alternative reality game, Traces of Hope, which the charity developed.

On the BBC's Children in Need, Buerk has performed several times along with an ensemble of BBC News presenters. In 2004, he dressed in leather to perform Duran Duran classics and in 2005, he sang Queen's "Bohemian Rhapsody".

Opinions
In August 2005, Buerk asserted in a Radio Times interview that the "shift in the balance of power between the sexes" has gone too far, we need to "admit the problem", and that men are now little more than "sperm donors". In particular, Buerk objected to the many women now in senior positions within the BBC. Former newsreader Anna Ford commented: "He's a dear old-fashioned chauvinist of the first order."<ref>Tom Leonard "Buerk 'is bonkers if he thinks women are taking over the world'", Telegraph, 17 August 2005</ref>

An article was published in anticipation of Buerk's 45-minute TV-essay, "Michael Buerk on What Are Men For?", which was part of a series on Channel Five, Don't Get Me Started! broadcast on Tuesday 23 August 2005. Guardian television reviewer Sam Wollaston thought Buerk had "been thoroughly, and quite rightly, crucified" in the pre-publicity. At the Hay-on-Wye literary festival earlier in the year, Buerk criticised contemporary newsreaders for being overpaid autocue-reading "lame brains".

At the end of 2012, Buerk despaired of the state of Britain and of the BBC. Of the corporation's coverage of the Thames River Pageant celebrating Britain and the 60th anniversary of Queen Elizabeth II's accession to the throne, he wrote: "The Dunkirk Little Ships, the most evocative reminders of this country's bravest hour, were ignored so that a pneumatic bird-brain from Strictly Come Dancing could talk to transvestites in Battersea Park."

In an article for Radio Times in April 2014 about 'grey power' in television, Buerk referred to presenters who had gone to employment tribunals over claims of age discrimination. Several older female presenters have won cases over wrongful dismissal. Buerk wrote: "If you got the job in the first place mainly because you look nice, I can't see why you should keep it when you don't." Quoting a comment by Anne Robinson ("The viewers don't want to watch ugly") he speculated: "She seemed to say it through gritted teeth, or at least a flawless but strangely taut face – a sign perhaps that she had taken her own advice to stop complaining and work on staying attractive." He did though quote Angela Rippon who spoke positively about older people (including herself) being able to continue their careers in television.Hatty Collier "Michael Buerk criticises female presenters who 'cry ageism'", The Guardian, 8 April 2014 Responding to Buerk in The Guardian, presenter Miriam O'Reilly, who won her case for unfair dismissal on age grounds in 2011, asserted: "The rules that apply to women in TV don't apply to men. Men can age, women can't. Women have to be attractive, men don't."

In 2016, Buerk was critical of Emma Thompson, Benedict Cumberbatch, and other celebrity liberals. He said in an interview with Ross Kemp “I hate it when feather-bedded thesps pay flying visits to the desperate to parade their bleeding hearts and trumpet their infantile ideas on what 'must be done'. There's only so much of the Benedict and Emma worldview you can take."

In August 2019 it was reported that Buerk thought that the obese should be allowed to die an early death in order to save the NHS money. In an article in the Radio Times Buerk suggested allowing deaths due to obesity could be a benefit to society. He added, "See it as a selfless sacrifice in the fight against demographic imbalance, overpopulation and climate change."

Depictions
Buerk was imitated by Jon Culshaw on Dead Ringers.

Buerk's life and career has been the subject of a comedy musical, Buerk! The Newsical which debuted in London at the Network Theatre in May 2013.Entertainment focus Buerk! The Newsical review

Personal life
Buerk lives in Guildford, Surrey, with his wife Christine, with whom he has twin sons. One of his sons, Roland, formerly a BBC journalist too, survived the South Asian tsunami on Boxing Day 2004, and was also in Tokyo when the 2011 Tōhoku earthquake and tsunami struck.

Buerk was awarded the Golden Nymph award at the Monte Carlo festival for his reports on the famine from Korem in Ethiopia, first broadcast on 23 October 1984. The footage of the famine was shot by Mohamed Amin. He later said that the broadcast was one of "the most influential pieces of television ever broadcast [prompting] a surge of generosity across the world for Ethiopia [that raised] more than $130 million".

In 1991, Buerk was awarded an Honorary Degree (MA) by the University of Bath.

On 18 July 2013, Buerk was awarded an honorary "Doctor of the University" degree at Surrey University's awards ceremony in Guildford Cathedral.

Filmography
TelevisionBBC Points West – Reporter/PresenterBBC Midlands Today (executive producer)BBC South Today – ReporterBBC Nine O'Clock News (1976–2000)
(Industrial correspondent, 1976–77; Energy/Scotland correspondent 1977–81; South Africa correspondent 1983–87; Main presenter 1988–2000)BBC Ten O'Clock News (2000–2003)BBC One O'Clock News (1986–2003)
 BBC Breakfast 999 (1992–2003)
 A Royal Wedding – HRH Prince Edward, Earl of Wessex & Sophie Rhys-Jones (June 1999) – co-presenter with Sue Barker at Windsor.Total Eclipse (August 1999) – the main presenter on the historic solar Eclipse in Cornwall on BBC One.2000 Today – Co-presenterThe One Show (September 2010) – Stand-in presenterPineapple Dance Studios (2010) – NarratorBritain's Secret Treasures (2012–13) – Co-presenterInside the National Trust (2013) – PresenterBritain's Secret Homes (2013) – Co-presenterI'm a Celebrity...Get Me Out of Here! (2014) – ContestantPompeii with Michael Buerk (2016) – PresenterRoyal Recipes (2017–present) – PresenterHeir Hunters  (2017–present) - Presenter Britain by Boat (2018) - Co-presenterCelebrity 5 go Barging (2019) - Co-presenter

RadioThe Moral Maze (since 1990)The Choice'' (since 1998)

References

External links
Autobiography.

Michael Buerk through the years.
Moral Maze (BBC Radio 4)
British Red Cross profile

1946 births
BBC newsreaders and journalists
English people of Canadian descent
I'm a Celebrity...Get Me Out of Here! (British TV series) participants
Living people
People associated with the Royal National College for the Blind
People educated at Solihull School
People from Guildford
People from Solihull